Fort Tarout or Tarout Castle is a historic castle located at the top of a hill in the center of Tarout Island, Qatif, eastern Saudi Arabia. The base at which the castle was built on goes back to 5000 BC. The castle itself was built on the base of an old Phoenician temple, that was dedicated to Astarte, during the Uyunid Emirate (1076–1253). Other researchers believe that it was built in the 16th century between 1515 and 1520 AD during Portuguese invasion of Pesian gulf and was one of their dereferense point after they restored it on 24 March 1544.

Tarout Castle was originally built during the rise of Dilmun civilization and dedicated to the worship of Mesopotamian goddesses, such as Ashtar, which the name Tarout is derived from. The fort dates back to 5000 years ago, with many inscriptions found in it as well as the Mesopotamian God's statues. Invaded by the Portuguese in the 16th century, they took it as a military base, and was later left in ruins. It had 4 towers in total and one was destroyed during a battle.

The fort is located on a hill in the centre of Tarout Island; the hill is the highest feature on the island. There used to be a spring beside the castle called "Ayyin Aloudda" (the old spring) which was the main source of water for the Island.

See also

Qal'at al-Qatif
Ajyad Fortress
Qishla of Mecca
Tourism in Saudi Arabia

References 

Buildings and structures completed in the 5th millennium BC
16th-century fortifications
Forts in Saudi Arabia
Tourist attractions in Saudi Arabia
Archaeological sites in Saudi Arabia
Portuguese colonial architecture in Saudi Arabia
Castles in Saudi Arabia
Phoenician temples
Astarte
Dilmun